This is a list of media in Prince Albert, Saskatchewan.

Radio
The following stations are those local to Prince Albert, as well as those outside the area that can be tuned in easily.

Television
 Channel 8 CIPA-TV, CTV
 Cable 9 Citytv Saskatchewan
 Cable 10 Shaw TV, local community channel from Shaw Cable

Prince Albert was previously served by CKBI-TV channel 5, a private CBC Television outlet; this station would close down in 2002, with its transmitter becoming CBKST-9, a repeater of CBKST Saskatoon, which in turn was a semi-satellite of CBKT Regina. CBKST-9 closed down on July 31, 2012, due to budget cuts handed down by the CBC. CBC broadcasts continue to be received in the city via the network's national feed.

Newspapers
 Prince Albert Daily Herald
 Prince Albert Shopper
 Rural Roots

Internet Access

In February 2007, Prince Albert was selected as one of four cities in Saskatchewan to provide free-of-charge wireless Internet access. The free Internet access, made possible through the Government of Saskatchewan's " The Saskatchewan Connected Initiative", will be available to the City's downtown area, as well as the Saskatchewan Institute of Applied Science and Technology (SIAST) Woodland Campus.

Notes

Prince Albert
 
Media, Prince Albert